Malawi Adventist University is a private Christian university in Ntcheu Malawi affiliated to the Seventh-day Adventist Church.

It is run by the Seventh-day Adventist Church, and is part of its system of higher education the Seventh-day Adventist education system, the world's second largest Christian school system.

History
The Malawi Adventist University was established by an action of the Executive Committee of the Malawi Union Mission of the Seventh-day Adventist Church. As early as 1996, the action was taken to upgrade what was the Lakeview Seminary to a Junior College. It was envisaged to offer four year degree programmes of an already existing University. At that time the University of Eastern Africa, Baraton was the best candidate. In 1999 the Malawi Union Mission agreed to run the four year degree programmes.

In January 2000 the institution was opened as Malawi Adventist College. In the middle of 2006, the Malawi Union Officers, opened new negotiations with the University of Eastern Africa, Baraton for affiliation purposes. By May 2007 the negotiations had reached a remarkable stage leading to the signing of the Affiliation agreement between that University and the Malawi Adventist College on 27 May 2007. Later the Institution developed from a Junior College to an affiliated University.

These developments included Malamulo College of Health Sciences as a constituent college of the new University. For a long time, Malamulo College of Health Science had been offering certificate and Diploma programmes in Nursing and Midwifery, Lab Technology and Clinical Medicine. As soon as the college became part of the University, the process of developing degree programmes in the three fields of study was enhanced

See also

 List of Seventh-day Adventist colleges and universities
 Seventh-day Adventist education
 Seventh-day Adventist Church
 Seventh-day Adventist theology
 History of the Seventh-day Adventist Church
Adventist Colleges and Universities
Adventist Colleges and Universities

References

External links 

Universities in Malawi
Protestantism in Malawi
Universities and colleges affiliated with the Seventh-day Adventist Church
Buildings and structures in Central Region, Malawi